Yu-Gi-Oh! Master Duel is a free-to-play digital collectible card game based on the Yu-Gi-Oh! Trading Card Game, developed and published by Konami for Microsoft Windows, Nintendo Switch, PlayStation 4, PlayStation 5, Xbox One, Xbox Series X/S, Android, and iOS.

It was initially released January 19, 2022 for consoles and PC to positive reviews and rapidly climbed to the top of the Steam charts. On February 6, Konami announced the game had been downloaded over 10 million times. The game would later on be released in a few regions to iOS and Android January 26, 2022, with many more regional launches on February 2, 2022.

Gameplay and Structure 

The game is a direct translation of the Yu-Gi-Oh! card game, maintaining all newer mechanics introduced up to 2021. The game follows its own list of forbidden and limited cards, independent from those of the Asian OCG and western TCG.

Like the real life card game, Master Duel also follows the gachapon format of gaining new cards in set packs, which can be purchased via task-rewarded gems and legacy tickets or through purchased gems that share the same pool as free gems. Gems can be exchanged for different types of Booster Packs; one Booster Pack contains 8 cards, and by purchasing 10 Boosters at once a Super Rare card or higher is guaranteed, and if none is an Ultra Rare, then the next 10-pack roll of the same booster is upgraded to a guaranteed Ultra Rare card. Structure Decks containing fixed card lists are available for purchase for 500 Gems, up to 3 times per account. Bundles also allow the player to buy Booster Packs with a set card as a bonus, such as the Ash Blossom & Joyous Spring Bundle. Gems can also be spent on items to customize the gameplay experience, including Mates (animated 3D monsters that stand next to the playing field during Duels), field designs, card protectors, profile icons, and background pictures for the main menu. 

Unlike the real game, cards can be dismantled into craft points categorized by the card's technical rarity (Normal, Rare, Super Rare & Ultra Rare) and the amount imbursed determined by visual rarity (Basic [x10], Glossy [x15] & Royal Finish [x30]) which can then be used to craft cards (and by extension, decks) a duelist actually prefers, costing 30 craft points per card. Obtaining certain cards of SR or UR rarity (either from a pack or by crafting them) can unlock hidden booster sets called "Secret Packs" containing most, if not all, cards of the same archetype or theme, which the player can then purchase with gems for the following 24 hours, allowing one to very quickly complete the deck that Secret Pack is based on.

Deck building is also streamlined, with a searchable glossary of pre-made community decks available, although traditional "hand picked" deck building is also available as an option. Opponent's decks may also be saved as one's own after dueling in competitive modes, though missing cards will make the deck an unplayable reference guide until the player owns the missing cards, either through crafting, rewards, card packs or an alternate promotional means.

Development
Development of the title began in 2019 as a follow on from Yu-Gi-Oh! Duel Links, released in 2017. Konami wanted to develop a new game that would appeal to more experienced players, as opposed to Duel Links which was for more casual players.  During the development of the game, the idea arose of implementing a game mode that could be played alone, participating in duels against the AI. This eventually led to the implementation of Solo Mode in Master Duel. The game's music was mainly composed by Yasunori Nishiki.

Reception 

Yu-Gi-Oh! Master Duel received "generally favorable" reviews according to review aggregator Metacritic.

References

External links

Steam page

2022 video games
Android (operating system) games
Digital collectible card games
Free-to-play video games
IOS games
Konami games
Multiplayer online games
Nintendo Switch games
PlayStation 4 games
PlayStation 5 games
Video games scored by Yasunori Nishiki
Windows games
Xbox One games
Xbox Series X and Series S games
Master Duel
Video games developed in Japan